This article lists political parties in Bulgaria.

Bulgaria has a multi-party system, with numerous parties in which no single party usually manages to gain power alone, and parties must work with each other to form coalition governments. As of 2022 October 19.

Parliamentary parties

Parties/coalitions outside the parliament but participating in the election
Neutral Bulgaria
Attack (Атака)
Party of the Bulgarian Communists (Партия на Българските комунисти,)
 (Българска комунистическа партия)
 (russophilite za vazrazhdane na otechestvoto)

People's Party "Truth and Only the Truth" (Народна партия "Истината и само истината")
A Fair Bulgaria (Панаир България)
Political Movement "Social Democrats" (Политическо движение „Социалдемократи““)
United Social Democracy (Обединена социална демокрация)
Who (Кой)
Bulgarian Euro-Left (Народна партия "Истината и само истината")
Bulgarian National Unification (Българско национално обединение)
Bulgarian National Union – New Democracy (Български национален съюз - Нова демокрация)
Bulgarian Social Democratic Party (Българска социалдемократическа партия)
Bulgarian Union for Direct Democracy (Български съюз за пряка демокрация)
Conservative Union of the Right (Консервативен съюз на десницата)
IMRO – Bulgarian National Movement (ВМРО – Българско Национално Движение)
People's Voice (Глас народен)
Socialist Party "Bulgarian Way" (Социалистическа партия "Български път")
The Left (Левицата!)
Stand Up.BG (Изправи се.БГ)
Alternative for Bulgarian Revival (Алтернатива за българско възраждане)
Movement 21 (Движение 21)
Agrarian Union "Aleksandar Stamboliyski" (Земеделски съюз „Александър Стамболийски“)
Bulgarian Progressive Line (Българска прогресивна линия)

PP–DB
Middle European Class (Средна европейска класа)
Volt Bulgaria
United Agrarians (Обединени земеделци)
United People's Party (Единна народна партия)
Bulgaria for Citizens (Движение „България на гражданите“)
Republicans for Bulgaria (Републиканци за България)
We Are Coming (Ние идваме)
Dignity of United People (Достойнството на обединения народ )
There Is Such a People (Има такъв народ)

Other parties/coalitions
Bulgarian Agrarian National Union (Български земеделски народен съюз)
Bulgarian Communist Party (Българска комунистическа партия)
Bulgarian Democratic Center (Български Демократичен Център)
Bulgarian Democratic Party for European and World States (Българска демократическа партия за европейски и световни държави)
Bulgarian Left (Българска левица)
Bulgarian New Democracy (Българска Нова Демокрация)
Bulgarian Neoconservative Party (Българска неоконсервативна партия )
Bulgaria of Labour and Reason (България на труда и разума)
Bulgarian Workers and Peasants Party (Българска работническо-селска партия)
Bulgarian Workers' Party/Communists/ (Българска работническа партия /комунисти/)
Bulgarian Workers Socialist Party (Българска работническа социалистическа партия)
Bulgarian Homemade Brandy Association (Българска асоциация за домашна ракия)
Bulgarian Summer (Българско лято)
Che Guevara Movement (Че Гевара (организация))
Civil Union "Roma" (Гражданско обединение "Рома")
Democratic Party (Демократическа партия)
George's Day Movement (Движение Гергьовден)
Green Party of Bulgaria (Зелена партия на България)
Left Alternative (Лявата алтернатива)
Movement for an Equal Public Model (Движение за равноправен обществен модел)
National Front for the Salvation of Bulgaria (Natsionalen front za spasenie na Bŭlgariya)
National Democratic Party (Българското национално-демократическа партия)
National Movement for Stability and Progress (Национално движение за стабилност и възход)
New Time (Ново време )
New Zora (Нова Зора)
Bulgarian Front (Патриотичен фронт)
Bulgarian Democratic Union "Radical" (Български демократичен съюз "Радикал")
Entire Bulgaria (Цяла България)
Resistance Movement "23rd September" Bulgaria (Съпротивително движение "23 септември" България)
Revival of the Fatherland (Възраждане на Отечеството)
Society for a New Bulgaria (Общество за нова България)
The Poisonous Trio (Отровното трио)
Union of Communists in Bulgaria (Съюз на Комунистите в България)
Union of Free Democrats (Съюз на свободните демократи)
Union of Patriotic Forces and Militaries of the Reserve Defense (Съюз на патриотичните сили и военните от резерва "Защита")
Volya Movement (Движение Воля)

Defunct parties
Bulgarian Communist Party (Българска комунистическа партия)
Bulgarian Agrarian People's Union "Nikola Petkov" (Български земеделски народен съюз „Никола Петков“)
Bulgarian Agrarian People's Union - United (Български земеделски народен съюз - Обединено)
Bulgarian Business Bloc (Български бизнес блок)
Bulgarian Democratic-Constitutional Party (Българска демократ-конституционна партия)
Bulgarian Euroright (Българска евродесница)
Bulgarian Social Democratic Workers Party (Broad Socialists) (Българска работническа социалдемократическа партия (широки социалисти))
Bulgarian Patriots (Български патриоти)
Fatherland Front (Отечествен фронт)
Nationalist Party of Bulgaria (Националистическа партия на България)
United Democratic Forces (Обединени Демократични Сили)
United Patriots (Обединени Патриоти)

See also
 Lists of political parties
 Liberalism and radicalism in Bulgaria

References

Political parties
Bulgaria
 
Bulgaria
Political parties